Martin Frederic James Checksfield (29 April 1939 - 8 March 2002) was an English former first-class cricketer.

Checksfield was born at Marylebone and educated at Bryanston School, before going up to Christ Church, Oxford. While studying at Oxford he made his debut in first-class cricket for the Free Foresters against Oxford University in at Oxford in 1960. The following year he made a further appearance in first-class cricket, this time for Oxford University against Leicestershire at Oxford. He scored 59 runs across his two matches, with a high score of 42 for the Free Foresters.

Death
Checksfield died of liver failure on 8 March, 2002.

References

External links

1939 births
2002 deaths
People from Marylebone
People educated at Bryanston School
Alumni of Christ Church, Oxford
English cricketers
Free Foresters cricketers
Oxford University cricketers